Sandland Chapel is a chapel of the Church of Norway in Loppa Municipality in Troms og Finnmark county, Norway. It is located in the village of Sandland. It is an annex chapel for the Loppa parish which is part of the Alta prosti (deanery) in the Diocese of Nord-Hålogaland. The white, wooden chapel was built in a long church style in 1971 using plans drawn up by the architect Reidar Martinsen.

See also
List of churches in Nord-Hålogaland

References

Loppa
Churches in Finnmark
Wooden churches in Norway
20th-century Church of Norway church buildings
Churches completed in 1971
1971 establishments in Norway
Long churches in Norway